Pyrenidium is a genus of lichenicolous (lichen-dwelling) fungi. It is the only genus in the family Pyrenidiaceae. It has 13 species.

Taxonomy
The genus was circumscribed by Finnish lichenologist William Nylander in 1865, with Pyrenidium actinellum assigned as the type species. The family was originally proposed by Alexander Zahlbruckner in 1898, and later resurrected for use in 2019. Pyrenidium was previously classified in Dacampiaceae, but molecular phylogenetic analysis showed that this family was polyphyletic, and that Pyrenidium originated from a lineage distinct from the genera in that family.

Description
Members of the genus have ascomata that are perithecioid in form, often with blue-green pigment in the upper wall of the peridia. Their ascomata are either immersed in the host thallus, or bursting through surface (erumpent), exposing the upper part of the structure (sometimes still covered by tissue of the host thalli). They have bitunicate asci that contain from 4 to 8 ascospores. Infection by the fungus sometimes causes gall-like malformations of the host thallus.

Species
, Species Fungorum (in the Catalogue of Life) accepts 13 species of Pyrenidium:
 Pyrenidium actinellum 
 Pyrenidium aggregatum 
 Pyrenidium borbonicum 
 Pyrenidium coccineum 
 Pyrenidium cryptotheciae 
 Pyrenidium hetairizans 
 Pyrenidium hypotrachynae 
 Pyrenidium macrosporum 
 Pyrenidium octosporum 
 Pyrenidium santessonii 
 Pyrenidium sporopodiorum 
 Pyrenidium ucrainicum 
 Pyrenidium zamiae

References

Pleosporales
Taxa described in 1865
Dothideomycetes genera
Lichenicolous fungi
Taxa named by William Nylander (botanist)